Thunchan Parambu or Thunchan Memorial Trust and Research Centre is a place in Tirur, Kerala, South India.

Location
It is located 2 km south west of Tirur railway station and 28 km west of the District Headquarters city. It is a residential area.

History
Thunjan Parambu in Tirur in Malappuram is the birthplace of Thunchath Ezhuthachan, the father of the Malayalam language. A memorial ( Thunjan Smarakom ) for the great poet has been built at Thunjan Parambu in 1964.

Ezhuthachan
Ezhuthachan is considered as the Father of the Malayalam language, because of his devotion to the language, his influence on the acceptance of the Malayalam alphabet, and his extremely popular poetic works in Malayalam. The kilippaattu style in Malayalam was introduced by Ezhuthachan.

Literary Festival
A week-long literary festival is organized annually in last week of December. The famous "Thunchan Utsavam" is held here every year in the first week of February. On Vijayadasami day hundreds of people throng to Thunjan Parambu with their children, to initiate them into the world of letters. Poets and teachers help children to write on the white sands of Thunjan parambu with their fingers. Even budding poets and writers come here to offer their first works.

Memorials
The iron stylus with which Ezhuthachan wrote his texts on palm leaves and the ancient Kanjira tree under which he composed his poems and taught disciples are preserved here and displayed to public .

Biography
The main aim of the Thunjan Smaraka Samiti is to bring out a complete biography of Thunjath Ezhuthachan, to establish a library, to conduct classes and to establish a research centre and research facility for the up liftment of the Malayalam language etc. There is a research centre, cottages for writers, an auditorium, and a literary museum here. It is also a Manuscript Resource centre of the National Manuscript Mission.

Thunjan Parambu is 3 km from Tirur Railway Station and 32 km from Malappuram.

Transportation
Thunjan parambu village connects to other parts of India through Tirur town.  National highway No.66 passes through Tirur and the northern stretch connects to Goa and Mumbai.  The southern stretch connects to Cochin and Trivandrum.   Highway No.966 goes to Palakkad and Coimbatore.   The nearest airport is at Calicut.  The nearest major railway station is at Tirur.

Gallery

See also
Thunchath Ezhuthachan Malayalam University in Kerala
Tirur

References

External links

  
About Thunchan Parambu 
Tunchan Parambu
Tirur area